Kovach Island is the westernmost island in the Onogur group off the northwest coast of Robert Island in the South Shetland Islands, Antarctica.  The feature is rocky, extending 630 m in southwest-northeast direction and 240 m wide.  It is separated from Grod Island by a 100 m wide passage.  The area was visited by early 19th century sealers.

The island is named after the settlement of Kovach in Southern Bulgaria.

Location
Kovach Island is located 1.17 km north of Misnomer Point, 760 m southeast of Cornwall Island and 1.08 km west of Shipot Point.  British mapping in 1968 and Bulgarian mapping in 2009.

Maps
 Livingston Island to King George Island.  Scale 1:200000.  Admiralty Nautical Chart 1776.  Taunton: UK Hydrographic Office, 1968.
 L.L. Ivanov. Antarctica: Livingston Island and Greenwich, Robert, Snow and Smith Islands. Scale 1:120000 topographic map. Troyan: Manfred Wörner Foundation, 2009.  (Second edition 2010)
Antarctic Digital Database (ADD). Scale 1:250000 topographic map of Antarctica. Scientific Committee on Antarctic Research (SCAR). Since 1993, regularly upgraded and updated.

References
 Kovach Island. SCAR Composite Antarctic Gazetteer.
 Bulgarian Antarctic Gazetteer. Antarctic Place-names Commission. (details in Bulgarian, basic data in English)

External links
 Kovach Island. Copernix satellite image

Islands of Robert Island
Bulgaria and the Antarctic